Gencho Nakev, also written as Генчо Накев (born 1962 in Kazanlak, Bulgaria), is a Bulgarian painter.

From 1995 until now teacher of Drawing at the Chair of Drawing and Modelling at the Faculty of Architecture of the University of Architecture, Civil Engineering and Geodesy in Sofia (Bulgaria). Associate Professor since 2011. Member of the Union of Bulgarian Artists since 1992, and through UAB to AIAP of UNESCO. Lives and works in Sofia, Bulgaria.

His artworks are possessed by galleries in Sofia, Pleven, Gabrovo, Vidin, Blagoevgrad and Dobrich (Bulgaria), private collectors in Bulgaria, Germany, France, Czech Republic, Russia, USA, Canada, England and Turkey

Education 
1981 – High school education:
Specialized Secondary School of Fine Arts in Kazanlak

1987 – Post-Secondary-School education: University of Veliko Tarnovo, Faculty of Fine Arts,
Specialty: Painting

Individual Exhibitions 
 2015  – Art Gallery « Artamontsev », Sofia
 2015  – Art Gallery «  Aspect », Plovdiv
 2013  – Municipal Gallery of Pleven
 2012  – Union of Bulgarian Artists, Art Gallery « Sofia Press » – « Journey » I
 2012  – Art Gallery «  Aspect », Plovdiv – « Journey » II
 2011  – Art Gallery « Nesi », Burgas
 2010  – Art Gallery « Artamontsev », Sofia
 2009  – Art Gallery «  Aspect », Plovdiv
 2008  – Art Gallery « Artamontsev », Sofia
 2007  – Art Gallery «  Aspect », Plovdiv
 2007  – Art Gallery « Artamontsev », Sofia 
 2006  – Art Gallery «  Aspect », Plovdiv
 2005  – Art Gallery « Artamontsev », Sofia
 2004  – Art Gallery « Nesi », Burgas
 2004  – Art Gallery « Artamontsev », Sofia
 2003  – Art Gallery « Artamontsev », Sofia
 2001  – Art Gallery « Cyclopes », Sofia  
 1999  – Month of the European Culture, Sts Constantin and Helena Church, Plovdiv, the Old Town, presented by Art Gallery « Solers » 
 1998  – Art Gallery « Navilart », Varna 
 1993  – Municipal Gallery of Pleven
 1993  – « Gallery 13 », Pleven 
 1991  – « Rom – Art Gallery » – Braunschweig, Germany  
 1990  – Municipal Gallery of Pleven
 1990  – Gallery of the Union of Bulgarian Artists, 6 Shipka Street, Sofia
 1990  – Municipal Gallery of Sliven

Major groups’ exhibitions and forums 
 2009  – Exhibition « Layers » – the Art Gallery of the State Institute of Culture at the Ministry of Foreign 	   Affairs « Mission » and the Gallery « Artamontsev »  present Bulgarian artists at the Permanent 	   Representation of Bulgaria to the EU in Brussels 
 2006  – International Plein Air – Caorle (Italy)
 2004  – « Ohlyuv Art » (Snail Art) – project of Art Gallery « Artamontsev » and Mrs. Isabelle Sol 	   	   Dourdin, under the patronage of the spouse of the President of the Republic of Bulgaria, Mrs. 	  	   Zorka Parvanova, Programme for development of the ONU   
 2004  – V Graphic Art Workshop, Plovdiv 
 2002  – Exhibition “Small format”, Pleven 
 1999  – Art Fair – Francfort, Germany, presented by Galerie in der Prannerstrasse (Munich)
 1997  – Exhibition « Мiniature », Lebanon
 1997  – Exhibition « Krida Art », Sofia 
 1996  – « Rom – Art Galerie », Braunschweig, Germany
 1995  – « Rom – Art Gallerie », Braunschweig, Germany
 1994  – Union of the Bulgarian Artists, Art Gallery « Sofia Press » presents Bulgarian artistes in Liège, 	   Belgium 
 1993  – « Salon d’automne », Paris, France
 1992  – Exhibition of « Art Club » – Union of the Bulgarian Artists, Gallery 6 Shipka str., Sofia 
 1992  – Exhibition « Eroticism », Pleven 
 1992  – « Eroticism » Happening, Pleven 
 1991  – Exhibition of « Art Club » in « Rom – Art Galerie » – Braunschweig, Germany
 1991  – Kunstforum – Länderbank, Vienne, Austria – charity auction – presented by the Gallery of the 	  	   Union of the Bulgarian Artists “Sofia Press” 
 1991  – Exhibition of « Art Club », Cottbus, Germany 
 1990  – “The Ship” – installation/happening, forecourt of the Palace of Culture – Sofia	
 1990  – International Plein Air “Etara”, Gabrovo
 1990  – Group Exhibition “5 + 2”, Gabrovo
 1990  – Group Exhibition “ART”, Pleven
 1990  – Exhibition “7 + 2”, Pleven 
 1990  – Exhibition of the Artists of Pleven in the town of Sliven 
 1989  – Exhibition “Experiment”, Pleven – collective exhibition of artistes and photographers 
 1989  – “Awakening”, Pleven – installation/happening Gencho Nakev and Lyuben Kostov

References

1962 births
Living people
20th-century Bulgarian painters
20th-century male artists
21st-century painters
Male painters